Chasing Legends is a documentary film covering the events of the 2009 Tour de France from the perspective of . It premiered at the cinema in May 2010 in the US and October 2010 in the UK.

Among the cyclists featured in the film are Mark Cavendish, George Hincapie and Erik Zabel. Former cycling legend Eddy Merckx also makes an appearance.

References

External links
 

2010 films
American sports documentary films
2009 Tour de France
Documentary films about cycling
2010 documentary films
HTC–Highroad
Tour de France mass media
Eddy Merckx
2010s English-language films
2010s American films